Michael Seibert is a West German-German slalom canoeist who competed from the mid-1980s to the early 1990s. He won two medals in the K1 team event at the ICF Canoe Slalom World Championships with a silver in 1991 and a bronze in 1989.

World Cup individual podiums

References

German male canoeists
Living people
Year of birth missing (living people)
Medalists at the ICF Canoe Slalom World Championships